Andranik Hakobyan may refer to:
 Andranik Hakobyan (boxer)
 Andranik Hakobyan (poet)